Jagadamba Centre gets its name after the famous Jagadamba Theatre at this central junction of the city of destiny Visakhapatnam. This center forms the good old central shopping and entertainment hub of this port city.

Commerce
Jagadamba Center houses shops of various shapes and sizes. It's not a tourist destination but an ideal point to wrap up your tour by buying souvenirs from this market. There are a couple of authentic handicraft shops as well and are managed by the Government hence an ideal place to buy goods.

Tourists can also visit this site for exploring various shopping malls and restaurants located in close vicinity.

Gallery

References

Neighbourhoods in Visakhapatnam
Uttarandhra
Shopping districts and streets in India